Miguel Antonio Matus Caile was a Colombian writer, politician and historian. He was born in Arauquita, Arauca in 1928 and died in the city of Arauca in 2001. He came from a family of Lebanese immigrants that exerted a strong influence on the social and political life of the departments of Arauca and Meta. One of his brothers, Elías Matus, became a Senator of the Republic of Colombia, and a nephew, Jacobo Matus, was a leading politician who ran for the governorship of Meta. 

Matus Caile himself served in a variety of public roles in Arauca. He was Secretary of Agriculture and Public Works and between 1980 and 1982 he was National Intendant of Arauca. He was founder and president for life of the Academia de Historia de Arauca, and a member of the Academia de Historia de Colombia. He was a prolific writer, his works focused primarily on the history of his native region, e.g. Historia de Arauca and Arauca y su sector agropecuario.

Works
 Historia de Arauca
 Huellas de una Civilización
 Arauca y su Sector Agropecuario
 Arauca en la Gesta Libertadora
 Leyendas del Alto y Bajo Arauca
 El Veguero Julián
 Inspiración
 Genialidad Literaria
 Simón Bolívar
 Fray Ignacio Mariño, Capellán del Ejército Libertador
 Departamento de Arauca
 La Negrera
 Acontecer de un Romance
 Santander en los Llanos
 La Iglesia Católica en Arauca
 Disertaciones de un Académico
 Arauca, orientación turística

References

Colombian writers
1928 births
2001 deaths